Charles B. Tanner (November 25, 1842 – December 16, 1911) was an American soldier who fought in the American Civil War. Tanner received his country's highest award for bravery during combat, the Medal of Honor. Tanner's medal was won for his heroism at the Battle of Antietam near Sharpsburg, Maryland on September 17, 1862. He was honored with the award on December 13, 1899.

Tanner died in Baltimore, Maryland, in 1911. He is buried in Greenfield Cemetery in Uniondale, Nassau County.

Medal of Honor citation

See also
List of American Civil War Medal of Honor recipients: T–Z

References

1842 births
1911 deaths
American Civil War recipients of the Medal of Honor
People from Chester County, Pennsylvania
People of Delaware in the American Civil War
Union Army officers
United States Army Medal of Honor recipients
Military personnel from Pennsylvania